Babalwa Ndleleni (born ) is a South African female weightlifter, competing in the 75 kg category and representing South Africa at international competitions. She competed at world championships, most recently at the 2007 World Weightlifting Championships.

In 2006 she became South African Sportswoman of the Year.

Major results

Personal life
After her retirement, she worked in a call center, later has an admin job.

References

1979 births
Living people
South African female weightlifters
Place of birth missing (living people)
Weightlifters at the 2006 Commonwealth Games
Commonwealth Games medallists in weightlifting
Commonwealth Games bronze medallists for South Africa
Competitors at the 2007 All-Africa Games
African Games competitors for South Africa
20th-century South African women
21st-century South African women
Medallists at the 2006 Commonwealth Games